is a professional Japanese baseball player. He plays outfielder for the Saitama Seibu Lions.

References 

1998 births
Living people
Baseball people from Hokkaido
Japanese baseball players
Komazawa University alumni
Nippon Professional Baseball outfielders
Saitama Seibu Lions players